Colors of Love is a Grammy Award winning 1999 album of contemporary choral music by Chanticleer to a concept designed by Frank Albinder. The album won Grammy Award for Best Small Ensemble Performance at the 42nd Annual Grammy Awards.

Track listing
Cradle songs. Rouxinol do pico preto (Brazil) (4:22) ; Lulajze, jezuniu (Poland)(3:52) ; Buy baby ribbon (Tobago) (2:15) by Steven Stucky (10:14)
Village wedding  by John Tavener (9:39) 
Canti d'amor. Winds of May, that dance on the sea (1:13) ; O cool is the valley (1:08) ; This heart that flutters near my heart (2:17) ; Silently she's combing her long hair (1:28) ; Gentle lady, do not sing sad songs (2:27) ; Sleep now, O you unquiet heart (1:37) ; All day I hear the noise of waters (2:13) by Bernard Rands (12:32) 
Words of the sun  by Zhou Long (4:43) 
Tang poems. Written on a rainy night (3:20) ; Wild grass (2:14) by Chen Yi (5:45) 
The rub of love by Augusta Read Thomas (2:33) 
In time of Steven Sametz (9:17) 
Love songs. Look out upon the stars, my love (1:22) ; Love is a beautiful dream (2:41) ; Alas, the love of women (2:43) ; For stony limits cannot hold love out (1:02) ; All mankind love a lover (0:58) Augusta Read Thomas (8:46)

References

1999 classical albums